Lele Forood (born 10 September 1956) is the Peter and Helen Bing director of women's tennis at Stanford University. She has been the head coach since 2001, and has won 10 NCAA Championships. Previously, she was a top amateur and college tennis player. As a professional, she is best known for reaching the doubles semifinals at the 1977 US Open and at the 1978 US Open, upsetting reigning Wimbledon champion Virginia Wade. Forood reached a high ranking in singles of No. 30.

Amateur/College years
Forood was the high school state champion in Florida, then became a student at Stanford in 1974. She became a pro tennis player after her sophomore year in college, then returned to Stanford University and graduated in 1979 with a degree in sociology.

While playing at Stanford, she was named an All-American in 1976. She also was a National Collegiate singles finalist as a freshman and a semifinalist during her sophomore campaign in leading Stanford to two second place national finishes.

Pro career
In 1976, she and Raquel Giscafré reached the doubles semifinals at the US Open. Two years later, at the 1978 US Open, she upset third-seeded Virginia Wade in three sets in the third round. Forood won gold in singles and doubles in the 1975 Pan American Games.

Forood was a member of the Board of Women's Tennis Association from 1979 to 1987 and served as its secretary-treasurer from 1983 to 1987. She was the recipient of the WTA Player Service Award in 1983. After the tour and before coming back to Stanford, she promoted the first professional women's tour event in France from 1986 to 1988 in Strasbourg.

Coaching career
Forood was hired as an assistant coach at Stanford under Frank Brennan, who coached her as a junior and as a pro. During this time, Forood was recognized in 1997 as the ITA Division I National Assistant Coach of the Year.

When Brennan retired as head coach after the 2000 season, Forood took his place. In 2001, her first year as head coach, Stanford won the NCAA championship, making her the first female coach to win the NCAA team title in tennis. Her team has appeared in the NCAA tournament every year since she began coaching in 2001, and her team has won 10 national titles. As of the end of the 2022 season, her record is 510-57.
During her coaching career at Stanford, she achieved multiple championships. The team also accomplished an 89-match winning streak across three seasons (2004–2006). The home court 184-match winning streak at Stanford's Taube Family Tennis Stadium, which extended from the 1999 season to the finals of the NCAA championship in 2011 was one of the longer home winning streaks of any intercollegiate sport in NCAA Division I history.

Among the top tennis players who have played for her at Stanford include Nicole Gibbs, Mallory Burdette, Amber Liu and Kristie Ahn.

Head coaching record at Stanford

References

External links
 
 

Living people
Stanford Cardinal women's tennis coaches
Stanford Cardinal women's tennis players
Tennis players at the 1975 Pan American Games
American female tennis players
Pan American Games medalists in tennis
1956 births
Pan American Games gold medalists for the United States
American tennis coaches
Medalists at the 1975 Pan American Games